Daniel Fawcett Tiemann (January 9, 1805 – June 29, 1899) was Mayor of New York City from 1858 to 1860. He was a founding trustee of the Cooper Union for the Advancement of Science and Art.

Life 
Tiemann was an industrialist, who lived in Manhattanville where he owned D.F. Tiemann & Company Paint & Color Works, which manufactured pigments and paints. This business had been started originally in 1804 by his father, I. Anthony Tiemann, with his brother, Julius William Tiemann, and Nicholas Stippel. His father retired from the business in 1839. The Tiemann laboratory and factory was originally located on 23rd Street and Fourth Avenue in New York City, near Madison Square Park, later relocating uptown to Manhattanville in 1832.

He was educated in a private seminary and at age thirteen began an apprenticeship in the drugstore of H.M. Schiefflin & Co., on Pearl Street, until 1824, when he joined his father's company. He became a partner in the company in 1826.

In December 1857, Democrat Fernando Wood, the mayor of New York, was removed from office by the New York State Legislature, and an election was held to replace him.  Fed up with the corruption of Wood's administration, members of the Democratic Party's inner circle, powerful merchants such as August Belmont, John A. Dix, William Havemeyer, and John van Buren left the party and joined with reformers such as Peter Cooper, Republicans and Know-Nothings to create a fusion Independent Party.  They nominated Tiemann as their candidate, while Wood ran on the Democratic ticket. Tiemann won the election with 51.4% of the vote, against Wood's 48.6%.  He served for one term.

Tiemann was a member of the New York State Senate (8th District) in 1872 and 1873.

His younger brother, Julius William Tiemann, was one of the founding partners in the D.F. Tiemann company, and father of Hermann Newell Tiemann (1863–1957), who was a commercial photographer in New York City.

D.F. Tiemann was nephew-in-law of Peter Cooper, the American industrialist and inventor. In 1826, he had married Martha Clowes, Cooper's niece, and they had three sons and three daughters.

Legacy 
Tiemann Place, near 125th Street and Broadway in the New York City borough of Manhattan, and Tiemann Avenue, which extends from Pelham Parkway North to East 222nd Street in the northeastern part of the borough of the Bronx, are named for him.

References

Further reading 
 Williams Haynes, American Chemical Industry, Vol. 1, D. Van Nostrand Co., New York, 1954, pp. 203–204
 "Large Fire in Manhattanville", New York Times, September 17, 1879
 "Fire in a Paint Manufactory", New York Times, August 10, 1881
 "Daniel F. Tiemann Dead", New York Times, June 30, 1899
 "Efforts To Make Dyestuffs Here", New York Times, April 4, 1915
 "Tiemann Hall", New York Times, November 3, 1940
 "Tiemann"
 "Indian Spring and Tiemann's Fountain, Manhattan"
 "Walk:  Tiemann Place"
 Eric K. Washington, Manhattanville, Arcadia Publishing, 2002
 Teachers College Record, Vol. III, Columbia University Press, 1902, p. 17, 286
 "Biographical Sketches. Hon. Daniel F. Tiemann, Mayor of the City of New York",  [pp. 420–436] in Journals: The United States Democratic Review (1837–1859)
 "NEW-YORK CITY.; Board of Councilmen. Coroner's Inquests. The Abandoned Church. Well-Dressed Beggars. Accidents. Police Intelligence.", The New York Times, October 19, 1858, Wednesday. This has several orders and messages from Mayor Daniel F. Tiemann to the Board of Councilman of New-York.
 Ortssippenbuch Karlshafen The ancestors of Daniel Fowcett Tiemann (his father born in Bad Karlshafen, Germany) are published in the genealogical book "Ortssippenbuch Karlshafen", family number 4698.

External links 
Tiemann Place - Eric Washington site (archived 2011)

Mayors of New York City
1805 births
1899 deaths
New York (state) state senators
19th-century American politicians